22nd Division or 22nd Infantry Division may refer to:

Infantry divisions 
 22nd Division (People's Republic of China)
 22nd Division (United Kingdom)
 22nd Infantry Division (France)
 22nd Division (German Empire)
 22nd Reserve Division (German Empire)
 22nd Division (Imperial Japanese Army)
 22nd Motor Rifle Division NKVD, Soviet Union
 22nd Division (Spain)
 22nd Infantry Division (India), part of II Corps
 22nd Mountain Infantry Division (Poland)
 22nd Infantry Division (Philippines)
 22nd Division (South Vietnam)

Airborne divisions 
 22nd Air Landing Division (Wehrmacht)

Cavalry divisions 
 22nd Cavalry Division (United States)
 22nd SS Volunteer Cavalry Division Maria Theresia

Armoured divisions 
 22nd Panzer Division (Wehrmacht)

Aviation divisions 
 22d Strategic Aerospace Division, United States
 22nd Guards Heavy Bomber Aviation Division, Soviet Union

See also
 List of military divisions by number
 22nd Brigade (disambiguation)
 22nd Regiment (disambiguation)